Saguenay/Saint-Charles-de-Bourget Water Aerodrome  is located on the Saguenay River,  west northwest of Saint-Charles-de-Bourget, Quebec, Canada.

References

Registered aerodromes in Saguenay–Lac-Saint-Jean
Seaplane bases in Quebec
Transport in Saguenay, Quebec